Minalabac, officially the Municipality of Minalabac, is a 2nd class municipality in the province of Camarines Sur, Philippines. According to the 2020 census, it has a population of 53,981 people.

Geography

Barangays
Minalabac is politically subdivided into 25 barangays.

Climate

Demographics

Economy 

Minalabac is classified as a 2nd class municipality. Minalabac has the same economy as Libmanan, Cabusao, San Fernando, Milaor, Ocampo, Nabua, and Calabanga because of fishing in coastal barangays near Ragay Gulf particularly Salingogon, and Bagolatao. Minalabac has several beach resorts that also boosts the economy of the town. Majority of the land is devoted to rice, vegetables and other root crops.

Transportation 
Buses are used for transportation from Naga City to Minalabac, and from Bicol Central Station in Triangulo to the market of Minalabac. It is also accessible by Naga Airport in San Jose, Pili, Camarines Sur just by taking a 45 minute flight from Manila to Naga Airport and then take a jeepney going to the Minalabac public market.

Infrastructures 
The town has a couple of provincial roads. The main road in the town is the Milaor-Minalabac-Pili road and the other roads either goes to the Poblacion, other barangays, to Rinconada district, or even Albay.

Tourism
Two main summer beach destinations include the pebble beach in Bagolatao and sand beach in Hamoraon. The growing number of resorts offers amenities such as cottages, videoke, rest house, etc.

Government

Elected officials

References

External links

 [ Philippine Standard Geographic Code]
Philippine Census Information
Official Site of the Province of Camarines Sur

Municipalities of Camarines Sur
Metro Naga